Turtle Run is a stream located entirely within Ritchie County, West Virginia.

Turtle Run was so named by Native Americans after the turtle.

See also
List of rivers of West Virginia

References

Rivers of Ritchie County, West Virginia
Rivers of West Virginia